Stigmella diniensis is a moth of the family Nepticulidae. It is endemic to southern France.

The length of the forewings is 1.3-1.6 mm for males and 1.5-1.6 mm for females. Adults are on wing in April, May and September. There are probably several generations per year.

The larvae feed on Fumana ericoides, Fumana procumbens and possibly Helianthemum. They mine the leaves of their host plant. The mine consists of an exceptionally long and narrow corridor along the leaf margin, that widens towards the end. The frass is concentrated in a narrow central line.

External links
Fauna Europaea
bladmineerders.nl
The Cistaceae-feeding Nepticulidae (Lepidoptera) of the western Palaearctic region

Nepticulidae
Moths of Europe
Moths described in 1975